The 1996–97 Stanford Cardinal men's basketball team represented Stanford University as a member of the Pac-10 Conference during the 1996–97 NCAA Division I men's basketball season.  The team was led by head coach Mike Montgomery and played their home games at Maples Pavilion. Stanford finished in a three-way tie for second in the Pac-10 regular season standings and received an at-large bid to the 1997 NCAA tournament. The Cardinal would reach the Sweet Sixteen by defeating No. 11 seed Oklahoma in the opening round and Tim Duncan-led No. 3 seed Wake Forest in the second round. The season came to and end after an overtime loss to No. 2 seed Utah in the West Regional semifinals. Stanford finished with an overall record of 22–8 (12–6 Pac-10).

Roster

Schedule and results

|-
!colspan=12 style=| Regular season

|-
!colspan=12 style=| NCAA tournament

Schedule Source:

Rankings

*AP does not release post-NCAA Tournament rankings^Coaches did not release a week 2 poll

1997 NBA draft

References

Stanford Cardinal
Stanford Cardinal men's basketball seasons
Stanford Cardinal men's basketball
Stanford Cardinal men's basketball
Stanford